Arnold Schoenberg's Piano Concerto, Op. 42 (1942) is one of his later works, written in America. It consists of four interconnected movements: Andante (bars 1–175), Molto allegro (bars 176–263), Adagio (bars 264–329), and Giocoso (bars 330–492). Around 20 minutes long, its first performance was given on February 6, 1944, at NBC Orchestra's Radio City Habitat in New York City by Leopold Stokowski and the NBC Symphony Orchestra with Eduard Steuermann at the piano. The first UK performance was on 7 September 1945 at the BBC Proms with Kyla Greenbaum (piano) conducted by Basil Cameron. The first German performance took place at the Darmstadt Summer School on 17 July 1948 with Peter Stadlen as the soloist.

Commission

The concerto was initially the result of a commission from Oscar Levant. Despite paying at least $200 for the work, Levant found out that Schoenberg was demanding $1500. Levant stated he could not pay that fee, and although the two continued to exchange telegrams, in October 1942, Schoenberg rejected Levant's final offer of $500. Levant ended all negotiations stating, "I hereby withdraw utterly and irrevocably from any further negotiations... [and] wish no longer to be involved in [the concerto's] future disposition." Fortunately another American student stepped in to commission the concerto.  Henry Clay Shriver (1917–1994) studied counterpoint with Schoenberg at UCLA in the late 1930s, and then studied with Gerald Strang, a former teaching assistant of Schoenberg, in Long Beach in the 1940s. Shriver opted for a career in the law instead of music, which might explain his access to funds for the commission. Strang suggested the idea of  the commission to Shriver, who then wrote Schoenberg a check for $1000. He had already commissioned a string quartet from Schoenberg, who never finished the work, and had also kept in contact with the composer after his UCLA studies, being present at Schoenberg's home with other colleagues and students for the radio broadcast of the Chamber Symphony No. 1 in December 1940.  Gratefully, Schoenberg completed the concerto in December 1942 and dedicated it to his new patron, who held an original version of the work until his death in 1994.

Twelve-tone technique
The piece features consistent use of the twelve-tone technique and only one tone row ("the language is very systematic, it's the true dodecaphonic Schoenberg",) though not as strictly as Schoenberg once required (for example, the ninth, tenth and eleventh tones of the series are repeated before the twelfth tone is first heard). The opening melody is thirty-nine bars long and presents all four modes of the tone row in the following order: basic set, inversion of retrograde, retrograde, and inversion. Both of the inversions are transposed. Four different types of row partitioning are evident: linear, by dyads or tetrachords, free, and by trichords. Linear presentations are ordered, strict presentations of either complete rows or component hexachords, and dominate the Andante and Giocoso movements. The second type symmetrically divides the twelve-tone aggregate into either six dyads or three tetrachords, and is found in the Molto allegro. The third type consists of irregular presentations of segments or fragments of the row, and is used mainly in the Adagio section. The last type, trichordal partitioning, is found throughout the concerto, and is a two-dimensional design created from the discrete trichords of complexes made from pairs of inversionally combinatorial rows.

Programmatic aspects
The piece is a late work, written in America. The manuscript contains markings at the beginning of each of the four movements, suggesting an autobiographical connection between this work and the composer, as well as German refugees in general. The markings are "Life was so easy", "Suddenly hatred broke out", "A grave situation was created", and "But life goes on", each matched with a suitable expression in the music. These markings were not included in the final published version, as Schoenberg disapproved of this kind of fixed musical interpretation: they were to guide his composition of the work, and not to provide a programmatic reference for the listener.

Neoclassicism and form
Former Schoenberg student Lou Harrison said, "One of the major joys ... is in the structure of the phrases. You know when you are hearing a theme, a building or answering phrase, a development or a coda. There is no swerving from the form-building nature of these classical phrases. The pleasure to be had from listening to them is the same that one has from hearing the large forms of Mozart. ... This is a feeling too seldom communicated in contemporary music, in much of which the most obvious formal considerations are not evident at all. ... The nature of his knowledge in this respect, perhaps more than anything else, places him in the position of torch-bearer to tradition in the vital and developing sense". The concerto has been compared with the music of Johannes Brahms by Mitsuko Uchida, Sabine Feisst and AllMusic.

Aimard described the sections as follows:
"very Viennese," containing a "waltz"
full of, "anxious fragmentation," and the "sort of free Expressionist gestures that fueled his middle period"
"very expressive, sombre and tragic," "slow," containing a "Funeral March"
"very ironic and very varied in terms of character"

Stravinsky has criticized the piano writing in the concerto. Mitsuko Uchida, describing the work as very difficult for the pianist, points out that Schoenberg did not play the piano very well and that he "had no intention of writing effectively, or comfortably" for the instrument.

References

Sources

 
 
 

 Translated from Anon. "Concerto for Piano and Orchestra Op. 42: Programme Notes". Arnold Schoenberg Center, before 2002; archive from 30 October 2005, accessed 24 July 2015) .

Further reading

 Bailey, Walter B. 1982. "Oscar Levant and the Program for Schoenberg's Piano Concerto". Journal of the Arnold Schoenberg Institute 6, no. 1 (June): 56–79.
 Benson, Mark F. 1988. "Arnold Schoenberg and the Crisis of Modernism". Ph.D. diss., University of California, Los Angeles.
 Bishop, David M. 1991. "Schoenberg's Concerto for Piano and Orchestra, op. 42: A Reexamination of the Evolution of the Series in the Sketches". Journal of the Arnold Schoenberg Institute 14, no. 1 (June): 135–149.
 Brendel, Alfred. 2001. "On Playing Schoenberg's Piano Concerto". In Alfred Brendel on Music: Collected Essays, 311–321. Chicago: A Cappella. .
 Gartner, Richard. 2010. "Resisting Schoenberg? The Piano Concerto in Performance". MA diss., Open University.
 Haimo, Ethan. 1998. "The Late Twelve-Tone Compositions". In The Arnold Schoenberg Companion, edited by Walter B. Bailey, 157–75. Westport: Greenwood Press. .
 Hauser, Richard. 1980. "Schoenbergs Klavierkonzert—Musik im Exil". Musik-Konzepte, special issue: Arnold Schoenberg: 243–272.
 Hurst, Derek. 2006. "The Classical Tradition and Arnold Schoenberg's Concerto for Piano and Orchestra, Op. 42: Monothematic Sonata Form, Long-range Voice-leading and Chromatic saturation, and, "...ai tempi, le distanze..." for Piano and Electronic Sound". PhD diss. Waltham: Brandeis University.
 Johnson, Paul. 1988. "Rhythm and Set Choice in Schoenberg's Piano Concerto". Journal of the Arnold Schoenberg Institute 11, no. 1 (June): 38–51.
 Litwin, Stefan. 1999. "Musique et histoire: Le concerto de piano op. 42 d'Arnold Schoenberg (1942) / Musik als Geschichte, Geschichte als Musik: Zu Arnold Schönbergs Klavierkonzert op. 42 (1942)". Dissonance, no. 59 (February): 12–17.
 Liu, Wenping (刘文平). 2006. 怀念调性——勋伯格《钢琴协奏曲》Op.42创作特点研究 [Yearning for Tonality: A Study of Schoenberg's Piano Concerto, op. 42]. Tianjin Yinyue Xueyuan xuebao (Tianlai)/Journal of Tianjin Conservatory of Music (Sounds of Nature) 1, no. 84:55–61 and 74.
 Mäkelä, Tomi. 1992. "Schönbergs Klavierkonzert opus 42—Ein romantisches Virtuosenkonzert? Ein Beitrag zu Analyse der kompositorischen Prinzipien eines problematischen Werkes". Die Musikforschung 45, no. 1:1–20.
 Maurer Zenck, Claudia. 1993. "Arnold Schönbergs Klavierkonzert: Versuch, analytisch Exilforschung zu betreiben". In, Musik im Exil: Folgen des Nazismus für die internationale Musikkultur, edited by Hanns-Werner Heister, Claudia Maurer Zenck, and Peter Petersen, 357–384. Frankfurt: Fischer-Taschenbuch-Verlag. .
 Maurer Zenck, Claudia. 2002. "Klavierkonzert op. 42". In Arnold Schönberg: Interpretationen seiner Werke, 2 vols., edited by Gerold Wolfgang Gruber and Manfred Wagner, 2: 95–108. Laaber: Laaber-Verlag. .
 Mazzola, Guerino, and Benedikt Stegemann. 2008. "Hidden Symmetries of Classical Tonality in Schönberg's Dodecaphonic Compositions". Journal of Mathematics and Music 2, no. 1 (March): 37–51.
 Newlin, Dika. 1974. "Secret Tonality in Schoenberg's Piano Concerto". Perspectives of New Music 13, no. 1 (Fall–Winter): 137–139.
 Petersen, Peter. 1990. "'A Grave Situation Was Created': Schönbergs Klavierkonzert von 1942". In Die Wiener Schule und das Hakenkreuz: Das Schicksal der Moderne im gesellschaftspolitischen Kontext des 20. Jahrhunderts, edited by Otto Kolleritsch, 65–69. Studien zur Wertungsforschung 22. Vienna: Universal Edition.
 Schoenberg, Arnold. 1944. Concerto for Piano and Orchestra Op. 42 (score). Los Angeles: Belmont Music Publishers.
 Schoenberg, Arnold. 1975. Style and Idea: Selected Writings of Arnold Schoenberg, edited by Leonard Stein with translations by Leo Black. New York: St. Martins Press. Reprinted, Berkeley: University of California Press, 1984.  (cloth);  (pbk).

First movement
 Alegant, Brian, and Donald McLean. 2001. "On the Nature of Enlargement." Journal of Music Theory 45, no. 1 (Spring): 31–71.
 Mead, Andrew. 1985. "Large-Scale Strategy in Arnold Schoenberg's Twelve-Tone Music". Perspectives of New Music 24, no. 1 (Fall–Winter): 120–157.
 Mead, Andrew. 1989. "Twelve-Tone Organizational Strategies: An Analytical Sampler." Intégral 3: 93–169.

First, third, and fourth movements
 Rothstein, William. 1980. "Linear Structure in the Twelve-Tone System: An Analysis of Donald Martino's Pianississimo." Journal of Music Theory 24: 129–165. Cited in Alegant (2001).

External links
"Concerto for Piano and Orchestra, Op. 42 (1942)", Arnold Schönberg Center
 

Neoclassicism (music)
Schoenberg, Arnold
Twelve-tone compositions by Arnold Schoenberg
1942 compositions